The Great Synagogue of Petah Tikva,, is the city's central synagogue and located on Hovevei Zion Street, in the centre of Petah Tikva, Israel. The building was designed by Daniel HaCohen Lifshitz, one of the pioneering residents of the city and is named after James Mayer de Rothschild, the father of the Baron Edmond James de Rothschild.

History
Construction of the Great Synagogue of Petah Tikva began in 1885 with a contribution from the Hovevei Zion movement. Edmond James de Rothschild donated the money needed to complete the building, which was named Beit Yaacov in honor of his father.

The building includes a main sanctuary with overlooking women's section, as well as two smaller adjoining prayer rooms, and another room used for studying and praying. In the 1930s, a copper dome was added on the eastern facade. Six medallion images were painted between the arches of the central hall with depictions of Rachel's Tomb, the Western Wall, the Tomb of Absalom, a seven-branched menorah and the burial sites of Zaddikim in Tiberias.

The official nusach of the prayer is Nusach Ashkenaz, but throughout the day, the synagogue facilities act as a shtiebel with multiple parallel prayer sessions where the nusach is decided by the hazzan.

In the late 2000s, the synagogue was the target of vandals who spray-painted swastikas and other Nazi-themed words on the building and inside on multiple events.

Conservation work was then carried out on the synagogue, restoring it in keeping with blueprints from the 1930s.

See also
List of synagogues in Israel
Religion in Israel
Great Synagogue
Architecture of Israel

References

Image gallery

Ashkenazi Jewish culture in Israel
Ashkenazi synagogues
Orthodox synagogues in Israel
Buildings and structures in Petah Tikva
Buildings and structures in Central District (Israel)
Synagogues completed in 1900
1900 establishments in the Ottoman Empire